Nazma Akther is a Jatiya Party (Ershad) politician and a Member of the Bangladesh Parliament from a reserved seat.

Career
Akther was elected to parliament from reserved seat as a Jatiya Party (Ershad) candidate in 2019. She is Member of Standing Committee on Ministry of Foreign Affairs.

References

Bangladesh Jatiya Party politicians
Living people
Women members of the Jatiya Sangsad
11th Jatiya Sangsad members
21st-century Bangladeshi women politicians
21st-century Bangladeshi politicians
1967 births
Jatiya Party politicians